Stephen Jackson (born January 26, 1970) is a musician from Washington D.C. Most notably he is a founding member, singer and songwriter for the Washington D.C. based band the Pietasters and the record labels Slug Tone! and Indication Records.

Musical career
While attending college at Virginia Tech, Stephen Jackson and high school friends Tal Bayer, Chris Watt and Tom Goodin formed the ska, punk-rock band the Slugs in 1990. After changing the name to the Dancehall Crashers  and eventually the Pietasters, the band soon began playing shows with bands like the Skunks, Bad Manners and Bim Skala Bim. The Pietasters soon began recording their first musical tracks, and released early EPs and a full-length self-titled tape on their own SlugTone! label in 1990 and 1991.

Jackson began touring extensively with the Pietasters in 1992 after graduating with a degree in architecture, and has continued to do so to the present day. He has released seven full-length albums with the Pietasters.

Jackson continues to manage the band and is currently the only remaining original member of the band that has performed with the band full-time since 1990. He has appeared as one of the lead songwriters on every Pietaster album.

Musical influences
Jackson has credited early ska like Alton Ellis, Two-Tone Ska, Northern Soul, Stax, Motown Marvin Gaye, Punk Rock, the Beatles, Mick Jagger, U2, the Police, and the Clash amongst his numerous influences.

Touring history
Jackson has toured extensively with many bands during his career with the Pietasters: the Mighty Mighty Bosstones, the Reverend Horton Heat, the Slackers, Pennywise, No Doubt, NOFX, the Cherry Poppin' Daddies, the Toasters, the Specials, Joe Strummer and the Mescaleros, the Bouncing Souls, Less Than Jake, the Ramones, They Might Be Giants, the Meatmen, H2O, the Damned, Rancid, Ozomatli, Hepcat, Bad Brains and many others.

Discography

Studio albums
The Pietasters - 1993 on Slug Tone! Records
Oolooloo - 1995 on Moon Ska Records
Willis - 1997 on Hellcat Records
Awesome Mix Tape vol. 6 - 1999 on Hellcat Records
Turbo - 2002 on Fueled by Ramen
All Day - 2007 on Indication Records

Rare albums, EPs, singles, and others
The Ska-Rumptious 7 Inch - 1992 on Slug Tone! Records
All You Can Eat (EP) - 1992 on Slug Tone! Records
Soul Sammich - 1994 on Slug Tone! Records
Ocean - 1996 on Moon Records
Strapped Live! (live album) - 1996 on Moon Records
Comply - 1996 on Moon Records
Out All Night (Promo) - 1997 on Hellcat Records
Out All Night (EP) - 1998 on HellCat Records
Yesterday's Over (Promo) - 1999 on Hellcat Records
The Pietasters 1992-1996 - 2003 on VMS Records
Live at the 9:30 Club (DVD) - 2005 on MVD
NCAA Football 2006 (Game Menu and Minigame Soundtrack)
Crazy Baldhead: The Sound of '69 singing on Monkey Man

Videos
New Breed - a Burning Toast / Slug Tone! Records Production (or see it on YouTube)
Stoned Feeling - a Burning Toast / Slug Tone! Records Production
Out All Night - an Epitaph / Hellcat Records / Slug Tone! Records Production
Yesterday's Over - an Epitaph / Hellcat Records / Slug Tone! Records Production

References

External links

 
 Epitaph Records
 Bass Ackwards interview with Steve Jackson, 1997
 Aural States interview with Steve Jackson, 2007
 Mobtown Ska PodOmatic Podcast interview, 2008
 Diamondback interview, 2009
 Patriot Ledger interview, 2010

1970 births
American rock singers
American ska singers
Living people
Singers from Washington, D.C.
American ska musicians
21st-century American singers